"Silver Spurs (On the Golden Stairs)" is a country music song written by Cindy Walker and Gene Autry, sung by Autry, and released in 1946 on the Columbia label (catalog no. 36904). In February 1946, it reached No. 4 on the Billboard most-played folk chart. It was also ranked as the No. 27 record on the Billboard 1946 year-end folk record sellers chart.

See also
 Billboard Most-Played Folk Records of 1946

References

Gene Autry songs
1946 songs